Mitromorpha swinneni is a species of sea snail, a marine gastropod mollusk in the family Mitromorphidae.

Description
The length of the shell varies between 6 mm and 9 mm.

Distribution
This marine species occurs off the Canary Islands.

References

 Mifsud C. (2001). The genus Mitromorpha Carpenter, 1865 (Neogastropoda, Turridae), and its sub-genera with notes on the European species. Published by the Author, Rabat, Malta 32 pp.: page(s): 19; pl. 3 fig. 1,42,42a

External links
 
 

swinneni
Gastropods described in 2001